Route 157 is a four-lane north–south highway on the north shore of the Saint Lawrence River in Quebec, Canada. Its northern terminus is in Shawinigan at the junction of Route 153, and the southern terminus is at the junction of Route 138 in Cap-de-la-Madeleine, now part of Trois-Rivières.

Municipalities along Route 157

 Trois-Rivières - (Cap-de-la-Madeleine / Saint-Louis-de-France)
 Notre-Dame-du-Mont-Carmel
 Shawinigan - (Shawinigan-Sud / Shawinigan)

Major intersections

See also
 List of Quebec provincial highways

References

External links  
 Interactive Provincial Route Map (Transports Québec) 
 Route 157 on Google Maps

157
Transport in Shawinigan